Amparo Muñoz y Quesada (21 June 1954 – 27 February 2011) was a Spanish actress, model and beauty queen who won the Miss Universe 1974 competition in Manila, Philippines, being the first and only Spaniard Miss Universe titleholder thus far.

Muñoz surrendered both the title and crown after six months due to refusal to follow the rules and regulations of the Miss Universe Organization. During that time, no successor was willing nor assigned to officially take her vacated role.

After her shortened reign, Muñoz became a popular actress in Spain and starred in several comedies, including Mama Turns 100, and in the dramas Clara es el Precio, The Other Bedroom and Dedicatory. Her personal life was often shrouded in notorious events and public controversies. She died on 27 February 2011 due to cerebral aneurysm complications and was cremated and buried at the Roman Catholic cemetery of Saint Michael in Málaga, Spain.

Early life
Amparo Muñoz was born on 21 June 1954 in Vélez-Málaga to a blacksmith father and a housewife. She was the firstborn child among six children. Her godparents helped raise her at age seven due to their family’s poverty.

After finishing high school, she worked as an administrative office assistant for “The Southern” local newspaper in Málaga. The gay male director of the newspaper agency strongly  encouraged Muñoz to enter the beauty contest, “El Certamen de Belleza de Costa del Sol”  (English: Miss Sun Coast Beauty Contest) which gained her an entry sash to participate and won in the 1973 Miss Spain contest in Lanzarote city.

Miss Universe
Amparo Muñoz came from the town of Vélez-Málaga (Málaga) in Andalusia, where she had won the city title, to compete at the Miss Spain contest held in Lanzarote. After winning, she went on to win the Miss Universe 1974 pageant in Manila, Philippines.

According to her Filipina translator, Pilar Abesraturi Aldanese, she was homesick for her family and existing lover in Spain  at the time. By the six month after winning, she declined to participate in the New York Parade with American actors Robert de Niro and Al Pacino. Remaining in Malaga, she chose to stay with personal friends and later gave up her crown after she refused her upcoming travel assignment to Japan, at times even throwing her crown against a wall and down in the balcony window, which often required jewel repair.

Nevertheless, the Miss Universe Organization in an effort to save its public reputation of the company thoroughly insisted that Muñoz would remain as the official titleholder of Miss Universe 1974 since the title was not offered to first runner-up Miss Wales Helen Elizabeth Morgan – who eventually won Miss World 1974 and was herself ultimately dethroned a few days after winning the said crown. Due to the refusal of Muñoz to pass the coronation of her successor, the 21st Miss Universe  was assigned to pass on the Miss Universe crown in 1975.

Cinematic career
After her victory in pageantry, various cinematic directors took interest in her. Her first steps in cinema came in 1973 with in Wholesome Married Life, directed by Roberto Bodegas and written by José Luis Garci, she played the temptress of José Sacristán, a married man obsessed with publicity. In Tocata y fuga de Lolita she was the rebellious girl who displayed her beautiful bust, a big contributor to the movie’s popularity. In the 70’s, Spanish cinema was at the height of destape [double meaning: “liberalization” and “nudity”], and the splendid figure of Amparo Muñoz found 9 titles in which to reveal itself, including Clara es el Precio (Vicente Aranda, 1975), and The Other Bedroom (Eloy de la Iglesia, 1976), in which Amparo starred alongside the man who would be eventually her husband, the actor and singer Patxi Andión.

After appearances in Volvoreta (José Antonio Nieves Conde, 1976), Del amor y de la muerte (Antonio Giménez Rico, 1977), among other films, her cinematic career took a notable turn when she began a relationship with the producer Elías Querejeta, facilitating her appearances in films as important as Dedicatory (Jaime Chávarri, 1980), which called her to the attention of other directors in both Spain and Mexico, such as Felipe Cazals (Las siete cucas ), Pilar Miró (We Will Speak Tonight), Jaime Camino (The Open Balcony), Emilio Martínez Lázaro (Lulú of the Night), Imanol Uribe (The Black Moon). She became an instant celebrity in Spain, alongside the likes of Nino Bravo, Pedro Carrasco, Rocío Dúrcal, Rocío Jurado, Camilo Sesto, La Pandilla and other Spanish celebrities of the 1970s, following her victory at Miss Universe with a fruitful show business career.

In 1979, Muñoz acted in the comedy Mama Turns 100, by Carlos Saura. This was followed by performances in 1982's Todo un Hombre (He's all a Man), 1999's A Paradise Under the Stars and 2003's El Tahur. In 1980, she went to live in Mexico and partnered with Chilean national Flavio Labarca, who ran an antique shop.

In 1983, she co—starred with the 18th Miss Universe in a Philippine film “Hayop Sa Ganda” (English: Savagely Beautiful), but animosity developed due to her temperament and tardiness on camera set while opposing the film producers including her own talent manager, Natalie Palanca whom she physically slapped in public. For this offense, Munoz was legally sued by Palanca in the Philippine court (Trial in absentia) and was later ruled guilty of verdict by the Metropolitan Trial Court of Manila. 

In 1989, she returned to mainstream Spanish cinema with the movie Familia, by Fernando León de Aranoa and started a new life as an actress. In 1991, she lived with Victor Guijarro in the Philippines, thereby disappearing from film for seven years (1989—1996), but eventually her immediate family requested her return to Spain, during which began the alleged melancholia and extreme mental depression of Muñoz. Accordingly, though raised and baptized Roman Catholic, Muñoz later dabbled and experimented with various New Age philosophies, including Tibetan Buddhism, Indonesian—Balinese Hinduism and Soka Gakkai practices during the early 1990s.

Returning to Spain in 1996, growing tabloid newspaper accusations of prostitution, mental depression, drug addiction, Parkinson’s Disease, and Human Immunodeficiency Virus coupled with poverty and melancholia ravaged Muñoz’ public image, along with the physical decrepitude  allegedly causing emotional shame and her imminent  withdrawal from society.

Personal life 
In 1976, Muñoz met singer-songwriter Patxi Andión, who would become her husband, while making  The Other Bedroom. Accordingly, she claimed mistreatment from Andion and later had a miscarriage of pregnancy. They were married on 16 May 1976 and divorced in 1978.  However, due to the irregularities of this marriage according to Constitution of Spain, it was not legally finalized until 1983.

Afterwards, Muñoz had brief romantic relationships with Antonio Flores, Vicente Fernández and Máximo Valverde. She also had a romantic relationship with José Coronado and an “unnamed politician” which was never revealed to the public. Later on, she dated both Flavio Labarca when she lived in Mexico in 1980 and Víctor Rubio Guijarro in the Philippines in 1991, both who suffered from drug abuse by which Muñoz called off in both relationships.

The most significant extramarital relationship of Muñoz's life was with Spaniard film producer Elías Querejeta. She met Querejeta on the set of Mamá cumple cien años in 1978, which was nominated for the Academy Award for Best Foreign Language Film at the 52nd Academy Awards. The relationship subsequently received much publicity. 

At the earlier stage of their relationship, Munoz requested a divorce from Querejeta, who refused to divorce for the sake of public embarrassment (as coming from a devout Roman Catholic family) with his only daughter, Gracia Querejeta.  He remained legally married to his wife, Maria del Carmen Marin  throughout their relationship—although he and his legal wife had been living separate lives, there was never an official split and neither party pursued a divorce. Accordingly, after their reunion as a couple in 1996, Muñoz as a mistress, no longer interfered to break this union, and also never fought for neither marital nor conjugal rights.

Death
Muñoz had been long struggling with health issues. In 1975, she was medically diagnosed with mental depression. In the spring of 1991, she suffered from acute pancreatitis. In 2003, she was formally diagnosed with a brain tumor along with an arterial malformation in the vicinity of her Cerebellum.

Muñoz was advised by her physicians of imminent death in which she suffered two cerebral aneurysms, the first case which paralyzed half of her body. She died on 27 February 2011 (aged 56) in Málaga, and was given a highly private funeral at her own personal request. Her mortal remains were cremated on 1 March 2011 and her gravestone is marked at the Roman Catholic cemetery of Saint Michael in Málaga, Spain.

Filmography

Film

Television

Stage

References

External links

 

1954 births
2011 deaths
Beauty pageant controversies
Miss Spain winners
Miss Universe 1974 contestants
Miss Universe winners
People from Vélez-Málaga
Spanish beauty pageant winners
Spanish film actresses
20th-century Spanish actresses